Wayne Maurice Gomes  (born January 15, 1973) is an American former professional baseball relief pitcher. He played in Major League Baseball (MLB) from 1997 through 2002 for the Philadelphia Phillies, San Francisco Giants, and 
Boston Red Sox. Listed at 6' 2", 215 lb., Gomes batted and threw right handed.

Career
Born and raised in Hampton, Virginia, Gomes graduated from Old Dominion University with a degree in recreation and leisure studies, 
and is also a member of Phi Beta Sigma fraternity. In 1992, he played collegiate summer baseball with the Orleans Cardinals of the Cape Cod Baseball League and was named a league all-star.

In between, Gomes spent six seasons in the Minor Leagues, and also played winter ball with the Leones del Caracas club of the Venezuelan Professional Baseball League during the 2004 season.

Following his retirement from baseball, Gomes returned to his hometown area of Suffolk and formed the Virginia Baseball Academy.  The VBA soon would be located at the Hampton Family YMCA on LaSalle Avenue in Hampton, offering baseball training services, practice venues, and baseball products. In addition, the VBA served as the operator of the Peninsula Pilots AAU baseball and softball organization. 

Gomes was named to the  Colonial Athletic Association's 25th anniversary baseball team in 2010. He was inducted into the Old Dominion University Sports Hall of Fame in April 2001 and was inducted into the Hampton Roads African American Sports Hall of Fame on November 6, 2010.

Sources

External links

1973 births
Living people
American expatriate baseball players in Mexico
Baseball players from Virginia
Batavia Clippers players
Boston Red Sox players
Camden Riversharks players
Clearwater Phillies players
Lakewood BlueClaws players
Leones de Yucatán players
Leones del Caracas players
American expatriate baseball players in Venezuela
Major League Baseball pitchers
Mexican League baseball pitchers
Nashville Sounds players
Old Dominion Monarchs baseball players
Orleans Firebirds players
Pawtucket Red Sox players
Philadelphia Phillies players
Reading Phillies players
San Francisco Giants players
Saraperos de Saltillo players
Scranton/Wilkes-Barre Red Barons players
Sportspeople from Hampton, Virginia